The Queer Arts Festival is a multi-disciplinary arts festival produced annually in Vancouver, British Columbia.

The festival is produced by the Pride In Art Society (PiA).  The mission of the Pride in Art Society, a not for profit organization, is to promote the production and exhibition of queer art. The Pride in Art Society creates opportunities for dialogue between queer artists from different disciplines, encourages visibility and appreciation of queer art and artists through the presentation of events, including the Queer Arts Festival.

The QAF started as a small community art exhibit and has grown to include components from theatre, cabaret, erotica, dance, music, spoken word, and comedy.''
The Queer Arts Festival programs events in partnership with other Vancouver LGBT groups including Screaming Weenie Productions, the Vancouver Pride Festival and the Vancouver Queer Film Festival.

Pride In Art (PiA) began in 1998 as a collective of LGBT visual artists mounting a community art exhibition. In its early years, PiA focused primarily on the visual arts, occasionally presenting performing arts as well within the exhibition space. In 2006, the festival expanded into other disciplines and art forms presented as part of the Queer Arts Festival.

Mission statement
The Pride in Art Society fosters inclusion, equality and a strong political voice for the local queer community, including the historical contributions of queer artists. We combat homophobia by building greater public awareness and acceptance of individuals and groups outside sexual and gender norms.''

2010
The theme for the visual art in the 2010 Queer Arts Festival was "Queertopia: The Best Place On Earth?".  Artists were asked to imagine the ultimate queer community.

Performing artists include pianist Sara Davis Buechner; JODAIKO taiko drummers; comedians James Howell and Morgan Brayton; and a number of local and international guest performers.

References

External links
 

LGBT festivals in Canada
Festivals in Vancouver
LGBT culture in Vancouver
Queer culture